Sevgil Musayeva is a Ukrainian journalist from Crimea, Ukraine, chief-editor of internet publishing Ukrainska Pravda and an initiator of creating the Krym_SOS web portal.

Biography
Born on 18 June 1987 in Juma near Samarkand, Sevgil returned with her family to Crimea in 1989<ref>Musayeva, S. My Crimea. Hubs. 28 February 2014</ref> when the restrictions against the Crimean Tatars in the Soviet Union were abandoned. They settled in Kerch, Crimean Oblast. In 2004-2010 she studied at the Journalism Institute of Kyiv University. During that period Musayeva also worked for various business news agencies and publishers such as Ekonomichni novyny, Delo, Vlast deneg.

From June 2011 to August 2013 she worked as a correspondent for "Forbes Ukraine" until it was bought by Serhiy Kurchenko. With the start of Euromaidan, Musayeva was its activist and was creating reports for the project Hubs in facebook. In February 2014, she launched Hubs as a separate business news web portal becoming its chief-editor. After annexation of Crimea by the Russian Federation, she also became one of the founders of internet project Krym_SOS. Since October 2014 Musayeva is a chief editor of Ukrainska Pravda. Tomasz Fiala became the new owner of Ukrainska Pravda, Ukrayinska Pravda (26 May 2021)

In 2016, Sevgil was nominated on the Top 30 under 30 award by the Kyiv Post''.

She is one of Time magazine's top 100 most influential people of 2022.

References

External links
 
 Sevgil Musaieva, nako.org.ua
 Sevhil Musaieva, forumkyiv.org
 Sevhil Musaieva, womenua.today

1987 births
Living people
People from Juma, Uzbekistan
Uzbekistani emigrants to Ukraine
University of Kyiv, Journalism Institute alumni
Ukrainian women journalists
Crimean Tatar journalists
Ukrayinska Pravda
Crimean Tatar independence activists
21st-century journalists